Myrceugenia exsucca is an evergreen woody flowering plant species of the Myrtle family, Myrtaceae. The species is native to South America as far south as Chile. An example occurrence is in central Chile within the La Campana National Park. A common name for this tree is petra.

See also
Myrceugenia correifolia

Line notes

References
 Bernardo Gut. 2008. Trees in Patagonia, 283 pages
 C. Michael Hogan. 2008. Chilean Wine Palm: Jubaea chilensis, GlobalTwitcher.com, ed. N. Stromberg

exsucca
Flora of South America
Flora of central Chile
Plants described in 1861